Trọng Tấn (born 1976) is a Vietnamese singer and vocal music lecturer from Thanh Hóa. He specializes in traditional Vietnamese music and Vietnamese Red music.

Trọng Tấn started participating in arts performance and activities when he was still a student of Đào Duy Từ High School (Thanh Hóa). After finishing his high school studying, Trọng Tấn went to Hà Nội to apply for the entrance exam of Vietnam National Academy of Music. He passed the exam with the help of People's Artist Trần Hiếu, since the People's Artist discovered Tấn's talent. Trọng Tấn became well known after he received the First Prize of Good Singing Voice of Hanoi in 1997 and First Prize of National Good Singing Voice of Television in 1999. It is said that the audience was stingingly surprised when they heard the song "Tiếng đàn bầu"; some commented that Trọng Tấn is the best performer of "Tiếng đàn bầu" since the era of Kiều Hưng.

Trọng Tấn is known to be a resolute person who has a strong standpoint. He does not easily indulge the taste of the masses, but patiently clings to the classical music, especially the Vietnamese Red music, which makes him earn the title "Hoàng tử nhạc đỏ" (Prince of Red Music). Tấn, together with his partners Đăng Dương and Việt Hoàn, perservingly built up their fame and position with their particular genre and without any sponsor, private CD or flashy appearances.

Trọng Tấn is also considered to be a diligent music student and singer; he does not pay most of his attention to get fame and reputation through singing but spends a lot of effort to forge his skills and standards. Tấn's diligence is greatly admired by many of his students.

Notable albums
Một Chặng Đường
Rặng Trâm Bầu
Tình Yêu Trên Dòng Sông Quan Họ

External links
Trọng Tấn's profile
Trọng Tấn: hoàng tử nhạc đỏ

20th-century Vietnamese male singers
Living people
1976 births
21st-century Vietnamese male singers